KSYF may refer to:

 KSYF (FM), a radio station (107.5 FM) licensed to serve Olathe, Colorado, United States
 Cheyenne County Municipal Airport (ICAO code KSYF)